The following highways are numbered 409:

Canada
 Manitoba Provincial Road 409
 Ontario Highway 409

Costa Rica
 National Route 409

Japan
 Japan National Route 409

Norway
Fylkesvei 409 (Aust-Agder) Arendal-Tromøya (Norwegian National Road 409) is a single lane ringed road on Tromøy Island and connected to Tromøysundet on the mainland via Tromøy Bridge in southwest Norway.

United States
  Georgia State Route 409 unsigned designation for Interstate 24
  Louisiana Highway 409
  Maryland Route 409 (former)
 New York:
  New York State Route 409
 New York State Route 409 (former)
 County Route 409 (Albany County, New York)
  County Route 409 (Erie County, New York)
  Pennsylvania Route 409
  Puerto Rico Highway 409
  Virginia State Route 409 (former)
  Washington State Route 409